Talavasal block  is a revenue block of Salem district of the Indian state of Tamil Nadu. This revenue block consist of 35 panchayat villages. They are:
 Aragalur
 East Rajapalayam
 Kamakkapalayam
 Ladduvadi
 Navalur
 Periyeri
 Puthur
 Sarvoy Pudur
 Sitheri
 Thittacheri
 Vadakumarai
 Veppampoondi
 Arathi Agraharam
 Govindampalayam
 Kattukottai
 Manivilundan
 Pagadapady
 Puliankurichi
 Sadasivapuram
 Sathappady
 Thalaivasal
 Thiyaganur
 Varagur
 Veppanatham
 Deviyakurichi
 Iluppanatham
 Kavarpanai
 Navakurichi
 Pattuthurai
 Punavasal
 Sarvoy
 Siruvachur
 Thenkumarai
 Unathur
 Vellaiyur

References 

Revenue blocks of Salem district